José Mayer Drumond (born 3 October 1949) is a Brazilian former actor.

Biography and career
Mayer was born in Jaguaraçu, Minas Gerais, and made his debut on television in 1977 in an children's television series Sítio do Picapau Amarelo. Three years later, he was in the first season of Carga Pesada, in the episode "O Foragido". In 1983, for his performances in Bandidos da Falange and Guerra dos Sexos, he won the APCA Award for Best Newcomer Actor. He became notorious by his main role in the television adaptation of O Pagador de Promessas. Most known for his roles as a leading man in telenovelas, he also acted in several films, including Perfume de Gardênia, for which he won the Best Actor Award at the 25th Festival de Brasília.

In April 2017, Mayer was suspended of working with TV Globo after the wardrobe artist Susllen Tomani accused the actor of having sexually harassed her. Tomani related the incident to the newspaper Folha de S.Paulo. Mayer denied the accusation.

Selected filmography
 Sítio do Picapau Amarelo (1977) - Burro Falante (voice)
 Guerra dos Sexos (1983) - Ulisses da Silva
 The Lady from the Shanghai Cinema (1988)
 Tieta (1989) - Osnar
 Meu Bem, Meu Mal (1990) - Ricardo Venturini 
 Perfume de Gardênia (1992)
 História de Amor (1995) - Dr. Carlos Alberto Moretti
 A Indomada (1997) - Teobaldo Faruk
 Meu Bem Querer (1998) - Martinho Amoedo
 Laços de Família (2000) - Pedro Lacerda
 Presença de Anita (2001) - Fernando
 Esperança (2002) - Martino
 Mulheres Apaixonadas (2003) - César Andrade De Melo
 Senhora do Destino (2004) - Dirceu de Castro
 Páginas da Vida (2006) - Gregório "Greg" Lobo
 A Favorita (2008) - Augusto César
 Viver a Vida (2009) - Marcos Ribeiro
 Fina Estampa (2011) - José 'Pereirinha' Pereira
 Saramandaia (2013) - Zico Rosado
 Império (2014) - Claudio Bogari
 A Lei do Amor (2016) - Tião Bezerra

References

External links

1949 births
Living people
People from Minas Gerais
Brazilian people of Arab descent
Brazilian people of Lebanese descent
Brazilian people of German descent
Brazilian male television actors
Brazilian male telenovela actors
Brazilian male film actors
Brazilian male stage actors
20th-century Brazilian male actors
21st-century Brazilian male actors